The 38th Air Division is an inactive United States Air Force unit.  It was last stationed at Hunter Air Force Base, as part of Second Air Force of Strategic Air Command.  The division was inactivated there on 1 November 1959.

History
"The 38th Air Division began on 10 October 1951 at Hunter Air Force Base, Georgia, to develop and prepare policies and procedures pertaining to bombardment, air and ground training, operations, flying safety, and security. It also monitored and coordinated the manning, training, equipping and operational readiness of assigned units for the primary purpose of conducting strategic air warfare on a global scale. Its subordinate units participated in numerous training missions, which included simulated radar bombing and polar grid navigation, plus the Strategic Air Command bombing and navigation competition. During the 1950s, the division participated in and supported exercises such as Operations War Dance, Grey Warrior and Dark Night, and flew numerous air refueling sorties."

Lineage
 Established as the 38 Air Division and organized on 10 October 1951
 Discontinued on 16 June 1952
 Activated on 16 June 1952
 Inactivated on 1 November 1959

Assignments
 Second Air Force, 10 October 1951
 Eighth Air Force, 1 January 1959 – 1 November 1959

Components
Wings
 2d Bombardment Wing: 10 October 1951 – 1 November 1959
 308th Bombardment Wing: 10 October 1951 – 15 July 1959 (detached 10 October 1951 – 7 April 1952, 21 August 1956–c.26 October 1956)

Squadrons
 303d Air Refueling Squadron: 1 January 1959 – 1 October 1959

Stations
 Hunter Air Force Base Georgia, 10 October 1951 – 1 November 1959

Aircraft
 Boeing KB-29 Superfortress, 1951–1953
 Boeing B-50 Superfortress, 1951–1953
 Boeing KC-97 Stratofreighter, 1953–1959
 Boeing B-47 Stratojet, 1954–1959

Decorations
 Air Force Outstanding Unit Award: 1 November 1956 – 1 April 1957

Emblem
On a shield azure (Brittany blue), a semee of stars argent (white, outlined stone blue), over all an American bald eagle, volant recursant descendant, in pale, wings overture, all proper (head and tail white, body feathers shades of brown, beak and eyeball yellow, outlined stone blue). (Approved 16 August 1956)

Commanders

 Brigadier General F. E. Glantzberg, 18 October 1951
 Brigadier General Sydney D. Grubbs Jr., 27 February 1952
 Brigadier General Joseph J. Nazzaro, 26 January 1953
 Colonel John F. Batjer, 20 May 1955
 Brigadier General Charles B. Dougher, 15 August 1955
 Brigadier General John E. Dougherty, 23 June 1958
 Colonel William B. Kieffer, 4 September 1959 – 1 November 1959

See also
 List of United States Air Force air divisions

References

Notes

Bibliography

 

038
1951 establishments in Georgia (U.S. state)
1959 disestablishments in Georgia (U.S. state)